Poor Arnold's Alamanac was a newspaper comic strip by Arnold Roth. Each installment covered a single subject, with Roth devising gags on such topics as baseball, dogs, commuting, elephants, ice cream, smoking and the telephone.

Roth wrote and drew Poor Arnold's Almanac from May 31, 1959, to May 14, 1961 and again from 1989 to 1990. Roth initially created a color Sunday comic strip for the New York Herald Tribune Syndicate, and nearly three decades later, it was revived for the Creators Syndicate as both a daily and a Sunday feature. Roth recalled:

Books
John Updike did the introduction when Fantagraphics Books published a book of Roth's strip in 1998. Updike later reprinted that essay in his collection Due Considerations (2007). "All cartoonists are geniuses, but Arnold Roth is especially so," wrote Updike in his introduction.

References 

American comic strips
Gag-a-day comics
1959 comics debuts
1961 comics endings
1989 comics debuts
1990 comics endings
Educational comics